The Tennessee Volunteer men's tennis team represents the University of Tennessee, in Knoxville, TN. The program has appeared in 30 NCAA Tournaments. Additionally, the Vols have won 9 SEC Championships, 4 SEC Tournaments, and finished as national runner-up three times. Prominent ATP players who came to Tennessee include Tennys Sandgren, John-Patrick Smith, Chris Woodruff, Paul Annacone, Michael Fancutt, and Mike De Palmer.

History

Sam Winterbotham era
Sam Winterbotham was formerly the head coach of the Colorado Buffaloes men's tennis team from 2002–2006. After the 2006 season Colorado cut the men's tennis team due to budget constrains, and Winterbotham was subsequently named the 10th coach in Tennessee tennis history on October 24, 2006. 

He and his assistant Chris Woodruff joined forces when Tennessee was ranked No. 48 nationally, but the Vols quickly vaulted up the charts. From 2007-2015 Winterbotham led Tennessee to nine consecutive NCAA tournament appearances, including six appearances in the NCAA Round of 16, three appearances in the NCAA Quarterfinals, and one national championship appearance where they lost in a close match to USC 4-2. 

Winterbotham became the first head coach at Tennessee to win consecutive SEC regular season championships in 2010 and 2011. In 2010, the Vols finished 11–0 in Southeastern Conference and went on to become the first team to capture the SEC Tournament Title courtesy of three 4–0 shutouts. Three players—John-Patrick Smith, Rhyne Williams and Davey Sandgren—earned All-America honors. For the first time in Tennessee history, five Vols were named All-SEC. Five players also finished the year in the national ITA rankings.

In terms of sheer number of victories, from 2008 to 2011 the team wrapped up their most successful three-year period in program history with a 101–18 (.849) record, and year-end Top 19 rankings each season. The Vols went 31-2 in 2010, won 23 matches in 2008 and 2009, and claimed 24 wins in 2011. 

In 2014 Winterbotham coached doubles pair Mikelis Libietis and Hunter Reese all the way to the 2014 NCAA doubles title. After 11 years of coaching UT, as well as a 217-104 match record, Sam Winterbotham was fired on May 4, 2017 at the conclusion of the 2017 season. The Vols had struggled and missed the NCAA Tournament for two consecutive years in 2016 and 2017. In Winterbothams last two years at Tennessee he had a combined 25-31 record and the Vols were 3-21 in SEC play.

Chris Woodruff era
Winterbotham was replaced by long term assistant and former NCAA Singles Champion at Tennessee Chris Woodruff. In Woodruff's first season as head coach he led the Vols to a 21-9 record and 4th place in the SEC regular season standings with an 8-4 conference record. Tennessee made the semifinals of the SEC tournament losing to Texas A&M 4-0. The Vols returned to the NCAA tournament for the first time since 2015 beating UNC Wilmington 4-0 in the first round before losing to North Carolina 4-0 in the NCAA round of 32. 

In the 2019 season, Woodruff led Tennessee to the SEC title game, where they fell to #6 ranked Mississippi State. As the NCAA Tournament’s #14 seed, Tennessee fell in NCAA round of 16 to #3 seed Florida. They ended the season with a 22-8 overall record, and an 8-4 record in-conference. 

Tennessee was ranked #19, with a 14-2 record, when the 2020 season was cancelled due to the COVID-19 pandemic. 

In the 2021 season, Tennessee defeated #13 Ole Miss, #12 South Carolina, and #1 ranked Florida in consecutive days to win their first SEC Tournament since 2010, and entered the NCAA tournament as the #3 overall seed with a 24-3 record, and a 10-2 conference record. In the NCAA Tournament, the Vols beat Alabama A&M 5-0 and Memphis 4-0 in the round of 64 and 32. At the USTA National Campus in Orlando, Tennessee went on to defeat Arizona 4-3 in the NCAA round of 16, and #11 Georgia in the Elite 8. The team season ended with a 4-2 loss to #2 Baylor in the final four, concluding the year with a 28-4 record. One week later, Tennessee players Pat Harper and Adam Walton won the NCAA individual doubles championship for the program's first individual title since 2014. 

The Volunteers continued their run as a national power in the 2022 season, where they defeated #12 Texas A&M, #13 South Carolina, and #3 Baylor to advance to the ITA Indoor Championship. Despite losing to #4 TCU in the finals, Tennessee returned to the #1 overall ranking which they maintained for serval weeks. Despite struggling down the stretch and finishing 5th in the SEC with a conference record of 8-4, Tennessee made the semifinals of the SEC tournament and entered the NCAA tournament as the #6 overall seed. Hosting the first three rounds, the Vols defeated Tennessee Tech, Duke, and Florida State to advance to the NCAA final site destination hosted by Illinois. In the Elite 8, Tennessee got revenge from the previous season against #3 Baylor by winning 4-3, sending the Vols to the Final Four for the second consecutive season. There, eventual national champion and #7 seed Virginia ended the teams hope for their first national title. Tennessee finished with a final record of 26-8.

Head coaches
Source

Yearly record
Source

NCAA Tournament notes
Until 1988, the Men's NCAA Tournament only included 16 teams. From 1988 to 1994, the NCAA men's and women's tournament was a 20 team field, with 12 teams receiving byes to the round of 16. For the 1994 and 1995 NCAA tournaments, the field again consisted of just 16 teams. In 1996, the field for both genders was expanded to 48 teams. In 1999, the field expanded to the current format of 64 teams for both genders.

See also
Tennessee Lady Volunteers tennis

References

External links

University of Tennessee